Petros Klampanis (born July 15, 1981), is a Greek bassist, composer, arranger, producer, and educator.

Named a “Bass Ace” by Bass Player Magazine, composer and bassist Petros Klampanis grew up in Greece. In addition to his appearances in the US, he has performed at the  JazzAhead Festival in Bremen, XJazz Festival in Berlin, and others.

His 3rd album,  Chroma, released by Motema records, was awarded as the best Live album of 2017, by the Independent Music Awards and was featured in radio and press outlets including WBGO. Since 2011, he has recorded 5 albums as a leader.  His debut album “Contextual” was released by Inner Circle Music, while his second album “Minor Dispute”,  was selected as one of the best jazz records in 2015 by NPR (National Public Radio USA). His music has been performed by Greek Public Symphonic Orchestra and by MOYSA the Symphonic Youth Orchestra of Thessaloniki. 

His 4th album 'Irrationalities' was released in October 2019 by Enja/Yellowbird. It is a trio album, featuring long-time collaborators Kristjan Randalu and Bodek Janke. JazzTimes praised it as 'A dazzling, multifaceted thing of Beauty'. 'Irrationalities' received 3 awards at the 2020 Independent Music Awards: 'Jazz Instrumental' & 'Vox Pop' for the track 'Easy Come Easy Go' and 'Jazz Producer' for Petros Klampanis.

References 

downbeat.com
jazztimes.com
"A Chat with Petros Klampanis"
www.mataroa.gr
All About Jazz Interview
Bass Musician review of debut album
Jazz Online interview
JazzTimes review of debut album
Music Industry News
No Treble Basscape Video
No Treble archives for Petros Klampanis
ReviveMusic.com on Petros Klampanis composition entitled "Monkey Business"
Something Else review
Petros Klampanis at WOMEX Directory
Petros Klampanis at Ionio Music Academy Academic Staff
Imera Zante newspaper interview

External links 

Greek musicians
1981 births
Living people
 Motéma Music artists
People from Zakynthos